Nallajerla is a village in Rajamahendravaram district of the Indian state of Andhra Pradesh.

Demographics 

 Census of India, Nallajerla had a population of 13457. The total population constitute, 6712 males and 6745 females with a sex ratio of 1005 females per 1000 males. 1371 children are in the age group of 0–6 years, with sex ratio of 953. The average literacy rate stands at 73.99%.

References

External links
West Godavari 

Villages in West Godavari district